Huirangi is a settlement in Taranaki, New Zealand. Waitara lies about 7 kilometres to the north. The Waitara River flows to the east of the settlement, with the Bertrand Road suspension bridge providing access to the other side.

Education
Huirangi School is a coeducational contributing primary (years 1–6) school with a decile rating of 2 and a roll of 62. The school and district celebrated their centennial jubilee in 1972.

Notable residents 
Elsie Andrews (1888–1948), teacher and community leader

Notes

Populated places in Taranaki
New Plymouth District